David John Ling (2 July 1946 – 3 November 2018) was a former English first-class cricketer. 

He was born in Enfield, Middlesex. before representing Middlesex (1966–1968) and Suffolk (1963–1971) as a right-hand batsman and right-arm medium-fast bowler.

He died in November 2018 aged 72.

References

1946 births
2018 deaths 
English cricketers
Middlesex cricketers
Suffolk cricketers